Michael Kibbe (born 1945) is an American contemporary classical music composer born in San Diego, California. He has composed over 240 concert works and created numerous arrangements. His writing covers many musical styles, encompassing tonal, modal and non-diatonic languages. His style often incorporates modern structures but is still accessible to the popular classical listener. Some of his works come right of the Romantic Era  yet his style in some writings has been compared to Prokofiev.  There are influences of American composer Gershwin in the Serenade Number 2 for two clarinets that seem at once blues, jazz and classical. His music can often reflect themes that bring to mind different cultures.

Compositions 
At the core of his creative output are the 14 wind quintets, several works for solo woodwind with strings, and numerous other chamber music pieces for winds, strings, keyboards and percussion. Three Sonatas for bass clarinet and piano have also proven popular with clarinetists.  His work also encompasses larger forms: over a dozen concertos and works for band, orchestra and chorus. As a testament to his versatility, his Humboldt Currents Brass Octet (3 trumpets in B flat, horn, three trombones, and tuba), is a substantial work in three movements proving his ability to produce pieces other than for woodwinds and strings. Sophisticated and idiomatically written, Michael Kibbe’s octet is an accessible contemporary work perfectly suited to
collegiate or professional recitals and concerts, and is a welcome addition to the brass chamber repertoire.

His works have been played throughout the United States, Europe, Russia, Mexico, China and Israel by both professional and University orchestral and chamber groups. Recent performances have been by the San Fernando Valley Symphony, the Eureka Symphony Orchestra, Humboldt State University Concert Band  and the University of Texas Pan American Cello Festival. Many of his works have been performed on radio and published on music CDs.

Commissioned pieces 
Michael Kibbe has written pieces on commission for the Cultural Affairs Department of the City of Los Angeles, Humboldt State University Concert Band, Pacific Serenades (Los Angeles), the Jewel City Flute Choir (Glendale, CA) and the Buffalo-Niagara Concert Band, among others. In 1988, Kibbe won the Debussy Trio Award for best composer by the National Association of Composers in a national competition.

Performances 
Kibbe is an accomplished performer on most of the standard woodwind instruments, and holds a performing degree in oboe and bassoon from New Mexico State University and a composition degree from California State University, Northridge. His composition teachers include  David Ward-Steinman, Warner Hutchison, Aurelio de la Vega, Henri Lazarof and Roy Travis. Kibbe is currently an oboist and music librarian for the Eureka Symphony Orchestra in Northern California.

For four decades he worked with the Los Angeles film and recording industry in roles that included instrumental performer and music copyist for films, radio, TV and live venues (such as Barbra Streisand and Charlie Sheen weddings). For 17 years he was oboist with the North Wind Quintet  which did numerous public (including radio) and school performances and performed concert tours of Mexico three times. He was also principal oboist of the Symphonic Winds of Los Angeles for five years. Kibbe has performed as an artist on numerous published classical music CD's.

Michael Kibbe continues to compose and perform in Northern California.  His wife is Vanessa Kibbe, a professional violinist with the Eureka Symphony Orchestra. His son Victor Kibbe is a recording engineer and his son Peter Kibbe is a professional cellist.

Discography
Masks, Selected Chamber Works, a compilation of chamber music works composed by Kibbe for winds, string and mixed ensembles. Includes, Six Preludes for Solo Cello, Wind Quintets #1 and #7, a string duo and the atmospheric "Death in the Backyard" for soprano and small ensemble. 2017.

Debussy Trio Plays Harp, Flute, and Viola Trios. Michael Kibbe is composer of one piece entitled, Trio Op. 99.

Fantastic Voyage by North Wind Quintet. Kibbe is Oboist and arranger of the pieces.

Fantasy for Wizards performed by Wizards! Kibbe is composer of Divertimento Op. 39

Trio Indiana Kibbe is composer for Ebony Suite for 3 clarinets Opus 116

String of Pearls by LuminArias includes a 3 movement piece by Kibbe called Malibu Music for violin and viola.

Dance of the Renaissance, with Kibbe playing Oboe and Recorder

Bozza Nova by Mariinsky Clarinet Club with Kibbe works: Ebony Suite and Shtetl Tanzen

Bassics Music for Bass Clarinet and Piano,  Henri Bok, Sonata, Opus 40 by Michael Kibbe

References

External links 
 The complete list of his works may be found at www.michaelkibbe.com

1945 births
Living people
Music librarians
American male classical composers
American classical composers
20th-century American composers
20th-century American male musicians
21st-century American composers
21st-century American male musicians
Musicians from San Diego
Classical musicians from California